The Richard Wagner Museum is a cultural site in Lucerne, Switzerland, situated on the shore of Lake Lucerne in the district of Tribschen. The composer Richard Wagner lived here from 1866 to 1872; in 1933 it was opened as a museum.

History
The building, originally of the 15th century, was purchased by the Am Rhyn family in the 18th century. The external appearance dates from about 1800.

Wagner lived in the villa from April 1866, leasing it from Colonel Walter am Rhyn. He completed here the operas Die Meistersinger von Nürnberg and Siegfried, and worked on Götterdämmerung.

Franz Liszt's daughter Cosima joined him, and Eva and Siegfried, children of Wagner and Cosima, were born here. After Cosima's divorce from Hans von Bülow, she and Wagner were married in Lucerne in 1870. On 25 December of that year Wagner's composition Siegfried Idyll was first performed on the stairs of the villa.

Wagner moved to Bayreuth in 1872, planning to build a theatre. Apart from occasionally being rented during the summer, the house afterwards stood empty. In 1931 the house and surrounding parkland were purchased from the Am Rhyn family by the City of Lucerne. The villa was opened as a museum in 1933.

In 1938, the first Lucerne Festival began with a concert in the gardens of the villa, conducted by Arturo Toscanini. It included music by Wagner.

Description
In five rooms of the ground floor there is an exhibition about the life and works of the composer, showing historical photographs, paintings, memorabilia and original manuscripts. There is the bronze bust of Wagner by Fritz Schaper, and the composer's Erard grand piano, made in 1858.

Cultural events may take place in the salon on the ground floor, such as chamber concerts in which Wagner's grand piano is played.

See also
 List of music museums

References

Richard Wagner
Biographical museums in Switzerland
Music museums in Switzerland
Museums in Lucerne